Lioporeus is a genus of beetles in the family Dytiscidae, containing the following species:

 Lioporeus pilatei (Fall, 1917)
 Lioporeus triangularis (Fall, 1917)

References

Dytiscidae genera